Daviesia genistifolia, commonly known as broom bitter-pea, is a species of flowering plant in the family Fabaceae and is endemic to south-eastern continental Australia. It is a glabrous, low to open shrub with scattered, sharply-pointed, cylindrical phyllodes and yellow or orange-yellow, deep red and maroon flowers.

Description

Taxonomy
Daviesia genistifolia was first formally described in 1837 by George Bentham from an unpublished description by Allan Cunningham. Bentham's description was published in his Commentationes de Leguminosarum Generibus.

Distribution and habitat
Broom bitter-pea grows in dry forests and is widespread in south-eastern Australia from central Queensland through New South Wales to eastern Victoria and the Flinders Ranges in South Australia.

References

genistifolia
Flora of South Australia
Flora of Queensland
Flora of the Australian Capital Territory
Flora of New South Wales
Flora of Victoria (Australia)
Taxa named by George Bentham
Plants described in 1837